In Roman Civil Law, a Condictio (plural condictiones) referred to an "action" or "summons"; hence, compounds in legal Latin refer to various types of actions:
condictio causa data causa non secuta
condictio cautionis
condictio certae pecuniae
condictio certae rei
condictio certi
condictio ex causa furtiva
condictio ex injusta causa
condictio ex lege
condictio ex paenitentia
condictio furtiva
condictio incerti
condictio indebiti
condictio liberationis
condictio ob causam datorum
condictio ob injustam causam
condictio ob rem dati
condictio ob turpem causam
condictio possessionis
condictio sine causa
condictio triticaria

See also
Unjust enrichment

References

Roman law